Professional Adventure Writer or PAW (sometimes called PAWS for Professional Adventure Writing System) is a program that allows the user to write textual adventure games with graphic illustrations. It was written by Tim Gilberts, Graeme Yeandle and Phil Wade, based on Yeandle's earlier system called The Quill. PAW was published by Gilsoft in 1987 and quickly gained a loyal following. PAW improved over The Quill in several ways.  In particular, its textual input parser was more sophisticated, meaning inputs were no longer confined to the two-word telegraphic verb noun (e.g. "GO WEST; TAKE LAMP") style.  PAW also supported NPCs, different character sets, and full use of the memory of the 128K ZX Spectrum.
However, unlike their prequel The Quill, the PAW no longer supported other computer systems like the BBC Micro or the Commodore 64. Over 400 games were written using PAW.

To ensure that as much text as possible can be used, PAWS compresses the descriptions by replacing the most common letters combinations by tokens, using characters greater than 127 (the ones that, in the Spectrum, are used for storing the BASIC tokens).

In 2001, WinPAW was written by Douglas Harter. It could read adventures written in PAW, but ran under MS-Windows and had a few extensions to the original. The adventures made in WinPAW could only be played using the MS Windows runtime.  In 2009, InPAWS was released in its first version. It allows you to extract PAW adventures, edit them or create from scratch and write back a database for PAW for either Amstrad CPC or ZX Spectrum. Thus, it also allows PAW adventures to be ported between the systems.

Graeme Yeandle also released an updated version of the CP/M version of PAW for MS-DOS and called it PC Adventure Writer.

References

External links 
 
 Graeme Yeandle's Text Adventure Page
 Graeme Yeandle's Text Adventure Page
 The PAW Reservoir by Nacho A. Llorente *deleted by author*.

 WinPAW - PAW ported to MS Windows
 ngPAWS - PAW in JavaScript
 InPAWS - compiler/extractor for Gilsoft's PAW

1986 software
CP/M software
Text adventure game engines
Video game development software
ZX Spectrum software